BBC Good Food is a global food media brand, with a monthly magazine, website, app, live events and series of books.

It has had four editors since its launch: Mitzie Wilson (1987–1997), Orlando Murrin (1997–2004), Gillian Carter (2004–2018). The current editor is Christine Hayes.

Keith Kendrick is Head of Magazines along with Dr. Keith Rowley, with Christine Hayes as BBC Good Food'''s first brand editorial director. Roxanne Fisher is the editor of bbcgoodfood.com.

In November 2014, the BBC Good Food brand celebrated its 25th anniversary with a new logo, designed by international branding agency Lambie-Nairn.BBC Good Food magazine was awarded Food and Drink Magazine of the year at the DMA 2013 Digital Magazine Awards and Digital Magazine Of The Year at the PPA Digital Publishing Awards 2013.

 See also 
 BBC Food''

References

Lifestyle magazines published in the United Kingdom